Dandy Dam is small earth-filled dam in what was previously the North Waziristan District of the Khyber Pakhtunkhwa, Pakistan.

Construction was started in 2008 and completed in 2011 at a cost of PKR 553 million. The dam has a height of 101 feet, covered a length of around 1764 feet, with water storage capacity of 2907 acre feet. The dam irrigates around 2000 acres.

See also
 List of dams and reservoirs in Pakistan

References

Dams in Pakistan
Buildings and structures in Khyber Pakhtunkhwa
Dams completed in 2011
2011 establishments in Pakistan
Dams in Khyber Pakhtunkhwa